Claudio Damian Pronetto (born August 27, 1980) is an Argentine football midfielder who last played in Gresik United. He previously played in the Argentine Primera División for Talleres de Córdoba.

References

External links
 Claudio Pronetto at BDFA.com.ar 

Living people
1980 births
Argentine footballers
Argentine expatriate footballers
Association football midfielders
Expatriate footballers in Indonesia
Liga 1 (Indonesia) players
Gresik United players
Talleres de Córdoba footballers
PSM Makassar players
Deltras F.C. players
Racing de Córdoba footballers
Deportivo Miranda F.C. players
Club Atlético Sarmiento footballers
Club Atlético Tigre footballers
Sportspeople from Córdoba Province, Argentina